The Olympus Zuiko Digital 14-45mm F3.5-5.6 is an interchangeable lens for Four Thirds system digital single-lens reflex cameras announced by Olympus Corporation on September 28, 2004.

References
https://www.dpreview.com/products/olympus/lenses/olympus_14-45_3p5-5p6

External links
 

Camera lenses introduced in 2004
014-045mm 1:3.5-5.6